Abajaluy-e Sofla (also Romanized as Ābājālūy-e Soflá ; also known as Ābājālū-ye Soflá and Abājalū-ye Soflá) is a village in Tala Tappeh Rural District, Nazlu District, Urmia County, West Azerbaijan Province, Iran. At the 2006 census, its population was 192, in 62 families.

References 

Tageo

Populated places in Urmia County